Sadovoye is a rural locality (a selo) in urban okrug Blagoveshchensk of Amur Oblast, Russia. The population was 1,087 as of 2018.

Geography 
Sadovoye is located 12 km north of Blagoveshchensk (the district's administrative centre) by road. Splavnaya kontora is the nearest rural locality.

References 

Rural localities in Blagoveshchensk urban okrug
Blagoveshchensk